Emanuele Caso (born 26 April 2001), known professionally as Random, is an Italian rapper and singer. His stage name is pretty much a translation of his surname: "a caso" in Italian means "at random".

He participated at the Sanremo Music Festival 2021 with the song "Torno a te".

Discography

Studio albums 
 Giovane oro (2018)

Extended plays 
 Montagne russe (2020)

Singles 
"Bad bitch bionda" (2018)
"Re" (2019)
"Chiasso" (2019)
"180" (2019)
"Rossetto" (2019)
"Scusa a a a" (2020)
"Marionette" with Carl Brave (2020)
"Sono un bravo ragazzo un po' fuori di testa" (2020)
"Nudi nel letto" (2020)
"Ritornerai 2" (2020)
"Sono luce" (2020)
"Torno a te" (2021)

References

External links

Italian rappers
Living people
21st-century Italian  male singers
2001 births